Spohrs Crossroads is an unincorporated community along Martinsburg Road (West Virginia Route 9) to the west of Sleepy Creek in Morgan County in the U.S. state of West Virginia. The community was originally named Spohrs Cross Roads for the local Spohr family. It is sometimes erroneously known as Stohrs Cross Roads or Stohrs Crossroads.

Spohrs "Crossroads" is formed by Martinsburg Road's intersection with the Potomac-Virginia Line Road, Morgan County Route 8. North of Spohrs Crossroads, Morgan County Route 8 is known as Potomac Road, and south of the crossroads, it is known as Spohr's Road. It reaches the Virginia state line at Unger where it is known as Virginia Line Road.

References

Unincorporated communities in Morgan County, West Virginia
Unincorporated communities in West Virginia